Pentaspadon is a genus of plants in the family Anacardiaceae.

Taxonomy

Species
, Plants of the World online has 6 accepted species:
 Pentaspadon annamense 
 Pentaspadon curtisii 
 Pentaspadon minutiflora 
 Pentaspadon motleyi 
 Pentaspadon poilanei 
 Pentaspadon velutinus

References

 
Anacardiaceae genera
Taxonomy articles created by Polbot